The 1989 NSWRL season was the 82nd season of professional rugby league football in Australia. Sixteen clubs competed for the New South Wales Rugby League's J.J. Giltinan Shield and Winfield Cup Premiership during the season, which culminated in a grand final between Balmain and Canberra. This season NSWRL teams also competed for the 1989 Panasonic Cup. This would be the last time a mid-season competition was played concurrent with the regular season. From 1990 it would become a pre-season competition.

Season summary
Twenty-two regular season rounds were played from March till August, resulting in a top five of South Sydney, Penrith, Balmain, Canberra and Cronulla (who finished equal with Brisbane but beat them in a play-off for fifth) to battle it out in the finals.

This year Penrith forward Geoff Gerard set new record for most first-grade NSWRL premiership games at 320 before retiring at the end of the season.

The 1989 season's Rothmans Medal was shared by Cronulla-Sutherland forward Gavin Miller and Newcastle front-rower Mark Sargent. Miller also won the Dally M Award and was named Rugby League Week's player of the year.

The grand finals:

  Canberra Raiders vs  Newcastle Knights (Senior Grade)
  North Sydney Bears vs  Parramatta Eels (Reserve Grade)
  South Sydney Rabbitohs vs  Canberra Raiders (Under-21s Grade)

The winners in all grades were:

  Canberra Raiders (Senior Grade)
  North Sydney Bears (Reserve Grade)
  South Sydney Rabbitohs (Under-21s Grade)

The State of Origin Series

  Queensland vs  New South Wales

Teams
The lineup of teams remained unchanged from the previous season, with sixteen clubs contesting the premiership, including five Sydney-based foundation teams, another six from Sydney, two from greater New South Wales, two from Queensland, and one from the Australian Capital Territory.

Advertising
1989 was a watershed year for the New South Wales Rugby League's advertising commencing an association with Tina Turner that would last until 1995. In those years the NSWRL, its ad agency Hertz Walpole and promotions consultant Brian Walsh would fundamentally change the image and popular perception of the game in Australia.

Agency copywriter Paul Knights inspired by the brutal simplicity of the game, saw a link to the lyrics in Tina Turner's 1987 hit What You Get Is What You See written by Terry Britten & Graham Lyle. Negotiations were assisted by the fact that her Australian manager Roger Davies was familiar with the game and the rights deal was easily done. There was initially no intention to film Tina performing the song but at the last minute an availability appeared in her schedule. The agency and a production crew were despatched to England along with the NSWRL's General Manager John Quayle bearing bags of balls, jumpers and branded goalpost pads. Leading players Cliff Lyons (Manly) and Gavin Miller (Cronulla) were both in England at the time playing for Leeds and Hull Kingston Rovers respectively and made themselves available for the film and promotional stills shoot with Tina. In the finished ad the Tina footage is interspersed with the usual big hits and crowd scenes plus shots of the star players of the time in pre-season training. Lyons appears in the commercial in a hammy locker room shot with Tina.

Initial questions about the relevance of Tina to the Australian game were displaced when the up tempo, sexy ad appeared and the long running and successful association began.

Regular season

Bold – Home game
X – Bye
* – Extra time game
Opponent for round listed above margin

Ladder

Ladder progression

Numbers highlighted in green indicate that the team finished the round inside the top 5.
Numbers highlighted in blue indicates the team finished first on the ladder in that round.
Numbers highlighted in red indicates the team finished last place on the ladder in that round.
Underlined numbers indicate that the team had a bye during that round.

Finals
Cronulla and Brisbane, having finished equal fifth, played off for a semi-final berth. Cronulla would secure fifth position via a dominant display in a midweek clash on neutral turf at the recently constructed Parramatta Stadium.

Despite being on fourth place on the ladder, Canberra went on to win the competition, the first club to do so since the top five system's introduction. They won their last nine games of the season. Canberra's win also saw them become the first non-Sydney based club to win the premiership.

Chart

Grand final

For only the second time ever, the grand final was not an all-Sydney affair. A number of rugby league writers have referred to the 1989 grand final as the greatest ever; Canberra, who were beaten grand finalists in 1987, had won five games straight in order to make the finals, and in the finals accounted for Cronulla, an emerging Penrith team, and minor premiers South Sydney to qualify for their second grand final, though any loss would have eliminated the side from contention.

Canberra captain Mal Meninga had to overcome a broken arm from earlier in the season and played in a special cast. Also playing for the Raiders were future representative stars Laurie Daley, Bradley Clyde, Ricky Stuart, Steve Walters and his younger brother Kevin and Glenn Lazarus, as well as established stars Gary Belcher, Brent Todd and John "Chicka" Ferguson. Canberra were coached by Tim Sheens.

Their opponents Balmain, beaten grand finalists in 1988, boasted a Test-strength pack including Steve "Blocker" Roach, Paul Sironen, Ben Elias, Bruce McGuire, and inspirational captain Wayne "Junior" Pearce, as well as a backline that included Garry Jack, goalkicking English import Andy Currier, New Zealand halfback Gary Freeman, former Wallaby rugby union winger James Grant, and schoolboy sensation Tim Brasher, were favourites to win. The Tigers were again coached by former Canterbury-Bankstown dual premiership winning coach Warren Ryan.

The pre-match entertainment was provided by Marc Hunter, Debra Byrne, Michael Edward Stevens, boy soprano Ben Hawks & John Williamson.

Balmain led 12–2 at half time, having scored two tries against the run of play. The first came after an intercept by winger James Grant, snatching an offload from Raiders prop Brent Todd. The second was a great team effort with Paul Sironen steaming over under the posts after lead-up work from Andy Currier and Grant, all starting from a kick ahead by Currier after he had received a perfect offload from Steve Roach.

Canberra had looked marginally the better side in the first half and coach Tim Sheens spoke effectively to his players at the break, stressing that they could be considered unlucky to be trailing. Fifteen minutes into the second half referee Bill Harrigan controversially ruled against Balmain second-rower Bruce McGuire for using offside Raider Steve Walters as a shepherd. From the ensuing penalty the Raiders kicked for touch and "Chicka" Ferguson set up the Raiders' first try when he escaped an attempted tackle by Currier, passed to Belcher, who also beat Currier to score. The gap was narrowed to 12–8.

Twice in the last twenty minutes Balmain nearly wrapped up the match. Michael Neil was ankle-tapped five metres from the line in a desperate dive by Mal Meninga. Then the Tigers' captain Wayne Pearce lost the ball with the line wide open and centre Tim Brasher unmarked.

Warren Ryan's decisions with fifteen minutes left to replace the enforcer Roach with defender Kevin Hardwick may have been the turning point in the game. Ryan effectively set out to defend a six-point lead, a tactic which ultimately backfired. Benny Elias' field goal attempt hit the cross bar, after he'd earlier had one charged down by Meninga. However, with 90 seconds to go and it seemingly all over for the Raiders, the evergreen Ferguson scored the try of his life. Chris O'Sullivan sent up a searching bomb, Laurie Daley was there to palm the ball to Ferguson who stepped back inside past three converging defenders to score close to the posts, enabling an easy conversion for Meninga to level.

With Canberra's confidence mounting, the game became the first grand final since 1977 to go into same-day extra time. At this point the Sironen/Roach replacements became crucial with neither able to resume the field for the extra period.

Garry Jack knocked on two minutes into extra time and from the scrum Canberra's five-eighth Chris O'Sullivan kicked a field goal. Minutes from the finish, Raiders replacement Steve Jackson received the ball fifteen metres from the line and made for the tryline, beating two men and then carrying a further three with him. As he was being brought down he reached out to place the ball one-handed on the line.

It was Canberra's first ever premiership; the first grand final won by an out-of-Sydney club; and the first team to win from 4th position. Canberra's nineteen-year-old lock Bradley Clyde was a deserved Clive Churchill Medal winner as the man of the match, though most agreed that a number of Raiders could have won the medal, including fullback Gary Belcher.

Such was the drama of the match that an account of it was written by Thomas Keneally entitled "A movie script that came to life". This memorable match is now commemorated each year with the 1989 League Legends Cup.

Canberra 19 (Tries: Belcher, Ferguson, Jackson. Goals: Meninga 3/6. Field Goal: O'Sullivan)

Balmain 14 (Tries: Grant, Sironen. Goals: Currier 3/4)

Referee: Bill Harrigan

Attendance: 40,500

Clive Churchill Medal: Bradley Clyde (Canberra)

World Club Challenge

On 4 October, Canberra played British champions Widnes in the 1989 World Club Challenge at Old Trafford, Manchester. The Raiders lost 18 to 30 in front of 30,768 people.

Player statistics
The following statistics are as of the conclusion of Round 22.

Top 5 point scorers

Top 5 try scorers

Top 5 goal scorers

References
 Clarkson, Alan (1997). The Greatest Games We Ever Played (Essay Collection, ed Geoff Prenter). Sydney: Ironbark Publishing.
 Rugby League Tables - Season 1989 Rugby League Tables.

Footnotes

External links
Article on the 1989 grand final at rleague.com
1989 grand final at eraofthebiff.com
  1989 grand final highlights
  1989 Winfield Cup TVC
1989 J J Giltinan Shield and Winfield Cup at rleague.com
NSWRL season 1989 at rugbyleagueproject.com
Results:1981-90 at rabbitohs.com.au

NSWRL season
New South Wales Rugby League premiership